Anaktuvuk Pass Airport  is a public use airport located in Anaktuvuk Pass, a city in the North Slope Borough of the U.S. state of Alaska. The airport is owned by North Slope Borough.

As per Federal Aviation Administration records, the airport had 3,832 passenger boardings (enplanements) in calendar year 2008, 3,856 enplanements in 2009, and 4,031 in 2010. It is included in the National Plan of Integrated Airport Systems for 2011–2015, which categorized it as a non-primary commercial service airport (between 2,500 and 10,000 enplanements per year).

Facilities and aircraft 
Anaktuvuk Pass Airport resides at elevation of 2,102 feet (641 m) above mean sea level. It has one runway designated 2/20 with a gravel surface measuring 4,800 by 100 feet (1,463 x 30 m). For the 12-month period ending January 1, 2006, the airport had 3,600 aircraft operations, an average of 300 per month: 89% air taxi and 11% general aviation.

Airlines and destinations 

The following airlines offer scheduled passenger service at this airport:

Statistics

References

External links 
 Alaska FAA airport diagram (GIF)
 Topographic map from USGS The National Map

Airports in North Slope Borough, Alaska